Peter Elisha Hume (born Peter Elisha Cobbe, 4 September 1985) is a New Zealand singer-songwriter, multi-instrumentalist and art director; originally from Whangaparaoa. Hume is the middle of three brothers (with Dann Hume and Jon Hume) who make up the multi-platinum award winning band Evermore. Hume has contributed to songs for Evermore and also sung lead vocals on some of the band's album tracks. In 2008, Hume was shortlisted for the Cleo Bachelor of the Year award.

Early life 
Born Peter Elisha Cobbe, Peter is the middle brother of the Hume family. Alongside brothers Jon and Dann they formed Evermore in Feilding in 1999. Hume attended Red Beach Primary School until the age of 9, after which, he and his brothers became home schooled by their mother.

Peter played inter-club tennis and had a great passion for colouring-in competitions along with his younger brother Dann Hume. Unfortunately his career as a colouring-in champion was cut short due to a scandal of adults believing the artwork was created by someone much older.

As teenagers, the Hume brothers moved to Australia to pursue music professionally. Their mother is from Australia and father is from New Zealand.

Evermore (1999–present) 

Hume has contributed to Evermore songs such as 'Hero', 'Come to Nothing', 'For One Day', 'Between the Lines', 'Follow The Sun' and 'It's Too Late' and also sung on Evermore album tracks including 'Morning Star', 'That's The Way', 'Dreaming... Pt.2', 'Broken Glass', 'Inside Of Me', 'Haunted', and 'It's Only Love'.

As part of Evermore, Hume plays bass guitar, keyboards, piano, ukulele, mandolin, guitar and vocals.

He also contributes artwork, photography, graphic design and cinematography to the band's albums, music videos and other promotional material.

Awards and nominations

ARIA Music Awards
The ARIA Music Awards is an annual awards ceremony that recognises excellence, innovation, and achievement across all genres of the music of Australia. Fanning has won five awards.

! 
|-
| 2022
| "Down Under" (Luude featuring Colin Hay) (dir. Peter Hume)
| ARIA Award for Best Video
| 
| 
|-

References

External links
Evermore Official Website

1985 births
Living people
Evermore (band) members
New Zealand bass guitarists
Male bass guitarists
New Zealand musicians
People from Feilding
21st-century bass guitarists
New Zealand male guitarists
New Zealand guitarists